Epsilon Mensae, Latinized to ε Mensae, is a single star  in the southern circumpolar constellation Mensa. It has an apparent magnitude of 5.52, making it faintly visible to the naked eye under ideal conditions.

Epsilon Mensae has a stellar classification of K2/3 III — intermediate between a K2 and K3 giant star. Epsilon Mensae has a metallicity 49% that of the Sun and is believed to be a member of the young disk population.

References 

Mensa (constellation)
Mensae, Epsilon
036039
2919
060816
K-type giants
Mensae, 43
PD-78 265